Emigdio C. Cruz was a Philippine Army officer and a recipient the Philippines' highest military award for courage, the Medal of Valor. Cruz was the personal physician of Manuel Quezon. After accompanying the Philippine President to the United States at the onset of the Pacific War, Cruz was sent back to the Philippines by Douglas MacArthur in order to establish contact with Filipino guerrillas fighting the Imperial Japanese forces occupying the country.

Medal of Valor citation
"Major Emigdio C Cruz (0520467) Philippine Army, in active service in the Army of the United States
for exceptional heroism beyond the call of duty in action on a secret mission from Washington to Australia and to the Philippines, from May 3, 1943 to February 28, 1944, the Medal for Valor is awarded to Major Emigdio C. Cruz, Philippine Army, in the active service of the Army of the United States. Major Cruz volunteered for the hazardous mission of entering the Philippines and obtaining information there of the great importance to the Government of the Commonwealth and the Southwest Pacific Command. His capture by the enemy would have meant torture and certain death. He landed in Negros, traveled by various means and under various guises to Manila and returned to Australia and thence to Washington, with his mission fully and satisfactorily accomplished. In accomplishing this dangerous mission, Major Cruz showed daring resourcefulness and long sustained courage."

References

Recipients of the Philippine Medal of Valor
Armed Forces of the Philippines Medal of Valor
Philippine Army personnel
1898 births
1978 deaths